Robert Lopez (born 1975) is an American songwriter of musicals.

Robert Lopez may also refer to:

 Robert Lopez (writer) (born 1971), American fiction writer
 El Vez, stage name of Robert Lopez (born 1960), Mexican-American singer-songwriter and musician
 Robert F. Lopez (1859–1936), United States Navy officer
 Robert Oscar Lopez (born 1971), professor of humanities at Southwestern Baptist Theological Seminary
 Robert S. Lopez (1910–1986), American economic historian
 Robert Lopez Mendy (born 1987), Senegalese footballer

See also
 Roberto López (disambiguation)
 Roberto Lopes (disambiguation)